Holly Williams is a Welsh arts and features writer and theatre critic.  She grew up in Wales, studied at the University of York and worked for a local newspaper before moving to London. From 2010 to 2016 she worked at The Independent and The Independent on Sunday. Since 2016 she has been a staff writer for WhatsOnStage.com. She has also contributed to The Daily Telegraph and the London Evening Standard. Since 2019, she has been a judge for the Evening Standard Theatre Awards.

References

External links
Official website

20th-century births
Living people
21st-century British journalists
21st-century Welsh women writers
Alumni of the University of York
British theatre critics
The Daily Telegraph people
The Independent people
London Evening Standard people
Welsh journalists
Welsh women journalists
Women theatre critics
Year of birth missing (living people)